Liang Youyu (1521–1556) was a Ming dynasty scholar. A native of Shunde (顺德) in Guangdong province, he completed the Jinshi (进士) level of the Imperial Examination in 1550. He was involved in two well known poetry circles "The Latter Five Poets of the Southern Garden" (南园后五子), and "The Seven Masters" (后七子). His most famous work is Lántīng Cúngǎo (兰汀存稿) (also known as Bǐbùjí 比部集).

External links

Ming dynasty poets
Ming dynasty politicians
1556 deaths
Poets from Guangdong
Politicians from Foshan
Year of birth unknown
1521 births
Writers from Foshan
Ming dynasty people